"The Memory Remains" is a song by American heavy metal band Metallica, with British singer Marianne Faithfull on backing vocals.

The lead single from Metallica's seventh studio album, Reload, released in 1997, it was first performed live in a "jam" version on July 2, 1996. Faithfull was brought in, as James Hetfield felt her "weathered, smellin'-the-cigarettes-on-the-CD voice" fit what he described as "the whole eeriness of the Sunset Boulevard-feel of the song", given the lyrics tell the story of a faded artist who goes insane from losing her fame. The spoken words "Say yes, at least say hello", during the outro, are a reference to The Misfits, the last complete movie in which Marilyn Monroe starred.

The song was written by James Hetfield and Lars Ulrich. It can be heard playing in the strip club Bada Bing! in the episode of The Sopranos, "The Knight in White Satin Armor". It is also used as one of the theme songs for WrestleMania XXVIII.

Asked if he would have bought Reload, bassist Jason Newsted said, "Not if I heard 'The Memory Remains' first."

Demo
The song's demo was called "Memory" and was recorded in Lars Ulrich's home musical studio "Dungeon" on March 6, 1995, (take 1) and March 17, 1995 (take 2).

Other versions
The band, with Marianne Faithfull, performed the song on the December 6, 1997, edition of Saturday Night Live. A live version was released as B-side to the single "The Unforgiven II". It was later performed with the San Francisco Symphony (conducted by Michael Kamen) for S&M and again for S&M2 (conducted by Edwin Outwater). Another live version was included on Orgullo, Pasión y Gloria. According to a post on Metallica's Facebook wall, they performed the song, again with Faithfull, on December 7, 2011, at the Fillmore in San Francisco.

Covers
Several bands have covered the song (either live or on record), including The Kovenant, Spleen, Iron Horse and The Stanford Harmonics.

Critical reception
Larry Flick from Billboard wrote, "Rock radio is already way hip to this smokin' jam from the band's new album, "Re-load". The time has come for popsters to climb aboard and join the fun. With its grinding, slow groove and winding melody, "The Memory Remains" has the traditional song structure and crisp production needed to attract listeners who don't usually indulge in such guitar-heavy fare. In fact, this song has the potential to draw a pile of new people into the band's
already massive legion of fans."

Chart performance
The single was successful, hitting number 28 on the Billboard Hot 100, number 3 on the Mainstream Rock Tracks chart and number 13 on the UK Singles Chart. It was Metallica's last appearance in the top 40 of the Billboard Hot 100 until 2008's "The Day That Never Comes". The song was Faithfull's first Top 40 single on the Hot 100 since 1965's "Summer Nights", and her last to date.

Music video
The "Memory Remains" music video (directed by Paul Andresen) features a surreal, anti-gravity concept. The band plays on a large, suspended platform making full and continuous rotations throughout the performance, like an enormous swing. The platform and band are actually stationary and the room, a giant constructed box, spins around it. Faithfull sings in a dark corridor and turns the crank of a street organ, the crank presumably attached to the rotating platform upon which the band plays. In some scenes paper money rains down, an allegorical reference. Throughout the music video, Jason Newsted fingerpicks his bass, despite almost exclusively playing with a pick throughout his career.

According to Encyclopedia Metallica, the video was shot at the Van Nuys Airport and cost $400,000, with the large platform costing over $100,000. The video premiered on MTV's Mattrock on November 15, 1997.

Track listing

Personnel
Metallica
James Hetfield – vocals, rhythm guitar
Kirk Hammett – lead guitar
Jason Newsted – bass guitar
Lars Ulrich – drums

Additional performer
Marianne Faithfull – additional vocals

Production
"The Memory Remains", "Fuel for Fire", and "The Outlaw Torn" produced by Bob Rock with Hetfield and Ulrich
"The Memory Remains" and "Fuel for Fire" mixed by Randy Staub
"The Outlaw Torn" mixed by Mike Fraser
"The Memory Remains" and "The Outlaw Torn" mastered by George Marino
"King Nothing (Tepid Mix)" remixed by Sascha Konietzko
"For Whom the Bell Tolls (Haven't Heard It Yet Mix)" remixed by DJ Spooky

Charts

Release history

References

Metallica songs
1997 singles
Songs written by James Hetfield
Songs written by Lars Ulrich
American hard rock songs
1996 songs
Elektra Records singles
Song recordings produced by Bob Rock
Number-one singles in Finland
Number-one singles in Iceland